Oakland Township is a township in Butler County, Pennsylvania, United States. The population was 2,987 at the 2010 census.

Geography
Oakland Township is located in east-central Butler County and contains the unincorporated communities of Woodbine, North Oakland, and Boydstown. Connoquenessing Creek flows through the northwestern part of the township, impounded as Lake Oneida for a portion of its course.

Demographics

As of the census of 2000, there were 3,074 people, 1,112 households, and 876 families living in the township.  The population density was 134.1 people per square mile (51.8/km2).  There were 1,168 housing units at an average density of 50.9/sq mi (19.7/km2).  The racial makeup of the township was 99.54% White, 0.10% African American, 0.16% Native American, 0.10% Asian, and 0.10% from two or more races. Hispanic or Latino of any race were 0.07% of the population.

There were 1,112 households, out of which 35.2% had children under the age of 18 living with them, 67.6% were married couples living together, 7.3% had a female householder with no husband present, and 21.2% were non-families. 18.4% of all households were made up of individuals, and 7.8% had someone living alone who was 65 years of age or older.  The average household size was 2.76 and the average family size was 3.15.

In the township the population was spread out, with 25.9% under the age of 18, 7.4% from 18 to 24, 30.1% from 25 to 44, 24.6% from 45 to 64, and 12.0% who were 65 years of age or older.  The median age was 38 years. For every 100 females there were 103.2 males.  For every 100 females age 18 and over, there were 97.4 males.

The median income for a household in the township was $41,025, and the median income for a family was $49,395. Males had a median income of $32,285 versus $22,854 for females. The per capita income for the township was $17,313.  About 6.9% of families and 6.0% of the population were below the poverty line, including 3.6% of those under age 18 and 19.2% of those age 65 or over.

References

External links
Oakland Township official website

Populated places established in 1798
Townships in Butler County, Pennsylvania